Zlataritsa Municipality is a small municipality (obshtina) in Veliko Tarnovo Province, Central-North Bulgaria, located in the area of the so-called Fore-Balkan north of Stara planina mountain. It is named after its administrative centre - the town of Zlataritsa.

Settlements 

Zlataritsa Municipality includes the following 24 places (towns are shown in bold):

Demography 
The following table shows the change of the population during the last four decades.

Religion
According to the latest Bulgarian census of 2011, the religious composition, among those who answered the optional question on religious identification, was the following:

An overwhelming majority of the population of Zlataritsa Municipality identify themselves as Christians. At the 2011 census, 69.6% of respondents identified as Eastern Orthodox Christians belonging to the Bulgarian Orthodox Church. A large minority is Islamic.

Sport 
The sport base in Zlataritsa is old and depreciated. Zlataritsa has developed different sports teams during the years, ranging from football, table tennis, wrestling, handball, athletics and others. The town has a local football team with the name of FC Botev 1921, which continued playing until 2014 in the Local Football Group of Veliko Tarnovo. The stadium's name is 23 September. After 2014 the football club no longer plays due to the lack of funds and players.

See also
Provinces of Bulgaria
Municipalities of Bulgaria
List of cities and towns in Bulgaria

References

External links
 Official website 

Municipalities in Veliko Tarnovo Province